This is a list of the 59 Members of Parliament (MPs) elected to the House of Commons of the United Kingdom by Scottish constituencies for the Fifty-Sixth Parliament of the United Kingdom (2015 to 2017) at the 2015 United Kingdom general election.

Composition at election

List

See also 

 Lists of MPs for constituencies in Scotland

Lists of UK MPs 2015–2017
Lists of MPs for constituencies in Scotland
2017 United Kingdom general election